James William Cusack (26 May 1788 – 25 September 1861) was the president of the Royal College of Surgeons in Ireland (RCSI) in 1827, 1847, and 1858.

Educated at Trinity College Dublin (TCD), Cusack graduated in arts in 1809, medicine in 1812 and he was later was awarded MD and M.Ch.

In 1806, Cusack was apprenticed to Ralph Smith O’bré and he studied at the RCSI. He was appointed resident surgeon (1813–34), assistant third surgeon (1834–56), governor (1838), and consulting surgeon (1856–61) at Dr Steevens' Hospital, Dublin. As resident surgeon, he became the chief administrator of the hospital and supervised the building of the new theatre. A bold and dexterous operator, he could use the scalpel without hesitation, and overnight became famous for his speedy first-aid treatment of a patient who was bleeding to death from a severed artery due to a gunshot wound.

In 1824 he was a founder of the Medico-Chirurgical School, Park St. (later Lincoln Place), which earned a high reputation, and was its professor (1824–49) of anatomy, physiology, and surgery. It closed (1849) and was later was bought by William Wilde (qv) and became St Mark's Ophthalmic Hospital.

As a surgeon, Cusack had a significant reputation, a large practice and an unusually large number of apprentices. He was elected Member of RCSI in 1814. He was consulting surgeon to several Dublin hospitals (Steevens', Swift's, City of Dublin, Rotunda and St. Mark's), and he was Surgeon-in Ordinary to the Queen in Ireland. He was elected MRIA (1829) and was a member of the RDS.

Two portraits of Cusack and busts by J. R. Kirk (qv) and John Lawler (1820–1901) are held in the RCSI.

See also
 List of presidents of the Royal College of Surgeons in Ireland

References 

Presidents of the Royal College of Surgeons in Ireland
Irish surgeons
Alumni of Trinity College Dublin
1788 births
1861 deaths
Burials at Mount Jerome Cemetery and Crematorium